Kim Ha-nul (Hangul: 김하늘; born April 11, 2002) is a South Korean figure skater. She represented South Korea at the 2018 Winter Olympics and has placed in the top ten at two ISU Championships – the 2018 Four Continents Championships and 2016 World Junior Championships.

Career

Early years 

Kim began learning to skate in 2010. Nationally, she finished 13th on the novice level in 2012 and 6th as a junior in 2013. Making her first appearance on the senior level, she placed 11th at the 2014 South Korean Championships, but was 22nd in

2015.

2015–2016 to 2016–2017 
Kim placed fourth in August 2015 during a Korean competition to select skaters for the ISU Junior Grand Prix (JGP) series. She made her JGP debut in September, finishing 13th in Colorado Springs, Colorado. She placed 7th in senior ladies at the 2016 South Korean Championships and was named in Korea's team to the 2016 World Junior Championships in Debrecen. Ranked 12th in the short program and 9th in the free skate, she finished 9th overall in Hungary.

The following season, she appeared at two JGP events and placed 8th at the 2017 South Korean Championships.

2017–2018 season 

In January, Kim placed 4th at the 2018 South Korean Championships and then 6th at the 2018 Four Continents Championships in Taipei, Taiwan.In February, she competed at the 2018 Winter Olympics in PyeongChang, South Korea. She ranked 21st in the short program, 10th in the free skate, and 13th overall. Concluding her season, she finished 15th at the 2018 World Championships, which took place in March in Milan, Italy.

Programs

Competitive highlights
GP: Grand Prix; JGP: ISU Junior Grand Prix; CS: Challenger Series

Detailed results
ISU Personal best highlighted in bold.

Senior level

Junior level

References

External links

 
 2015 Asian Open Trophy Results 
 2014 Asian Open Trophy Results 
 2015 ISU JGP Colorado Springs Results 

2002 births
Living people
Sportspeople from Gyeonggi Province
South Korean female single skaters
Figure skaters at the 2018 Winter Olympics
Olympic figure skaters of South Korea